Sachie Ishizu was the defending champion, but chose not to participate.

Kimiko Date-Krumm won the title, defeating Noppawan Lertcheewakarn in the final, 6–1, 5–7, 6–3.

Seeds

Main draw

Finals

Top half

Bottom half

References
 Main Draw*

Kangaroo Cup - Singles
2012 in Japanese tennis
Kangaroo Cup